The 1995 Colgate Red Raiders football team was an American football team that represented Colgate University during the 1995 NCAA Division I-AA football season. Colgate was winless and finished last in the Patriot League.

In its third and final season under head coach Ed Sweeney, the team compiled a 0–11 record. Joe Kasztejna, Ian Prisuta, Rob Howard and Tom Morelli were the team captains. 

The Red Raiders were outscored 367 to 134. Colgate's 0–5 conference record was the worst in the six-team Patriot League standings.

The team played its home games at Andy Kerr Stadium in Hamilton, New York.

Schedule

References

Colgate
Colgate Raiders football seasons
College football winless seasons
Colgate Red Raiders football